These are the official results of the 2005 Central American and Caribbean Championships in Athletics which took place on July 8–11, 2005 in Nassau, Bahamas.

Men's results

100 meters

Heats – July 9Wind:Heat 1: +2.3 m/s, Heat 2: -0.2 m/s, Heat 3: +0.3 m/s, Heat 4: 0.0 m/s, Heat 5: -0.4 m/s

Semi-finals – July 9Wind:Heat 1: +0.5 m/s, Heat 2: -0.4 m/s

Final – July 9Wind: +1.9 m/s

200 meters

Heats – July 10Wind:Heat 1: +0.5 m/s, Heat 2: +0.8 m/s, Heat 3: +1.1 m/s, Heat 4: -0.4 m/s, Heat 5: +3.0 m/s

Semi-finals – July 10Wind:Heat 1: +0.3 m/s, Heat 2: +2.8 m/s, Heat 3: +1.3 m/s

Final – July 11Wind: +1.9 m/s

400 meters

Heats – July 9

Final – July 10

800 meters

Heats – July 10

Final – July 11

1500 meters
July 10

5000 meters
July 10

10,000 meters
July 9

110 meters hurdles

Heats – July 10Wind:Heat 1: +0.6 m/s, Heat 2: -0.7 m/s

Final – July 10Wind:+2.6 m/s

400 meters hurdles

Heats – July 9

Final – July 9

3000 meters steeplechase
July 9

4 x 100 meters relay
Heats – July 10

Final – July 10

4 x 400 meters relay
July 11

20,000 meters walk
July 9

High jump
July 11

Pole vault
July 11

Long jump
July 10

Triple jump
July 11

Shot put
July 10

Discus throw
July 9

Hammer throw
July 10

Javelin throw
July 9

Decathlon
July 9–10

Women's results

100 meters

Heats – July 9Wind:Heat 1: +0.1 m/s, Heat 2: +0.4 m/s, Heat 3: +3.2 m/s

Final – July 9Wind:+1.1 m/s

200 meters

Heats – July 10Wind:Heat 1: +1.1 m/s, Heat 2: -0.2 m/s, Heat 3: +2.7 m/s

Final – July 11Wind:+3.8 m/s

400 meters

Heats – July 9

Final – July 10

800 meters

Heats – July 10

Final – July 11

1500 meters
July 10

5000 meters
July 9

10,000 meters
July 11

100 meters hurdles

Heats – July 10Wind:Heat 1: +1.0 m/s, Heat 2: +1.7 m/s

Final – July 10Wind:+1.5 m/s

400 meters hurdles
July 9

3000 meters steeplechase
July 10

4 x 100 meters relay
July 10

4 x 400 meters relay
July 11

10,000 meters walk
July 10

High jump
July 10

Pole vault
July 9

Long jump
July 11

Triple jump
July 9

Shot put
July 11

Discus throw
July 9

Hammer throw
July 9

Javelin throw
July 10

Heptathlon
July 10–11

References
Results
Men's Results
Women's Results

Central American and Caribbean Championships
Events at the Central American and Caribbean Championships in Athletics